Spyridon Vasileiadis (6 December 1845 – 30 August 1874) was a Greek poet and playwright. Several of his works were translated into French. He was a member of the Parnassos Philological Society. He died in Paris, aged 28.

Bibliography

Selected works:
Eikones kai kymata
Attikai nyktes
Galateia, drama

References

External links

1845 births
1874 deaths
Writers from Patras
Greek male poets
Greek dramatists and playwrights
First Athenian School
Poets from Achaea
19th-century Greek poets